Renaldo Sagesse (born December 23, 1986; surname means wisdom in French) is a Canadian football defensive lineman who is currently a free agent. He most recently played for the Saskatchewan Roughriders of the Canadian Football League. In the Canadian Football League’s Amateur Scouting Bureau December rankings, he was ranked as the ninth best player for players eligible in the 2011 CFL Draft.  On May 8, 2011 Sagesse was selected 25th overall in the draft by the Alouettes and signed a contract with the team on May 26, 2011. He was later released at the end of training camp. On May 31, 2012, Sagesse signed with the Saskatchewan Roughriders, but was released during training camp on June 17, 2012.

He played college football with the Michigan Wolverines.

He worked as a supervisor at Collège Notre-Dame and would later leave in December 2016. He is now working as the head coach of the Spartiate of CÉGEP Du Vieux-Montréal.

References

1986 births
Living people
American football defensive linemen
Canadian football defensive linemen
Michigan Wolverines football players
Montreal Alouettes players
Players of Canadian football from Quebec
Saskatchewan Roughriders players
Canadian football people from Montreal